The Yeovil Times (Yeoville Express) was a free weekly newspaper, published and distributed in South Somerset, in association with the Western Gazette. It was owned by Northcliffe Media, part of the Daily Mail and General Trust newsgroup. Its content is a largely based on local issues. The last issue was published on Nov 6, 2011.

References

Northcliffe Media
Newspapers published in Somerset
Yeovil